Ayesha Jhulka (born 28 July 1972) is an Indian actress who predominantly appears in Hindi films. She has also worked in Odia, Kannada and Telugu languages films.

Career

She has starred in films including Kurbaan (1991), Jo Jeeta Wohi Sikandar (1992), Khiladi (1992), Meherbaan (1993), Dalaal (1993), Balmaa (1993), Waqt Hamara Hai (1993), Rang (1993), Sangram (1993), Jai Kishen (1994), and Masoom (1996).

Personal life
Jhulka was born on 28 July 1972 to Wing Commander Inder Kumar Jhulka, an Indian Air Force officer and Sneh Jhulka. She is married to Sameer Vashi.

Filmography

Films

Television

See also

List of Indian film actresses

References

External links

Living people
Indian film actresses
20th-century Indian actresses
People from Srinagar
Actresses in Hindi cinema
Actresses in Telugu cinema
21st-century Indian actresses
Actresses from Jammu and Kashmir
Actresses in Odia cinema
1972 births